The Garden of Cosmic Speculation is a 30 acre (12 hectare) sculpture garden created by landscape architect and theorist Charles Jencks at his home, Portrack House, in Dumfriesshire, Scotland. Like much of Jencks' work, the garden is inspired by modern cosmology.

History

Features

The garden is inspired by science and mathematics, with sculptures and landscaping on these themes, such as black holes and fractals. The garden is not abundant with plants, but sets mathematical formulae and scientific phenomena in a setting which elegantly combines natural features and artificial symmetry and curves. It is probably unique among gardens, drawing comparisons with a similarly abstract garden in Scotland, Little Sparta.

Access
The garden is private but usually opens for only five hours on one day each year for 1500 ticket holders through the Scotland's Gardens programme and raises money for Maggie's Centres, a cancer care charity named for Maggie Keswick Jencks, the late wife of Charles Jencks.

Depiction in music
The garden is the subject of an orchestral composition by American composer, Michael Gandolfi, which he composed for a joint commission from the Boston Symphony Orchestra and the Tanglewood Music Center. The piece was subsequently recorded by the Atlanta Symphony Orchestra conducted by Robert Spano, and nominated for "Best Contemporary Classical Composition" at the 2009 Grammy Awards.

In literature
Louise Penny uses The Garden of Cosmic Speculation as an important plot device in her tenth Inspector Gamache mystery, The Long Way Home (St. Martin Press, 2014).

Cameron Jace makes creative use of The Garden of Cosmic Speculation in his fictional novel titled Circus, which is the third installment of his Insanity series. 
In the book, Jace uses many facts when referring to 'public' knowledge of the garden (per character conversation), but changed the name of the designer to better fit into the story's plot line.

See also
 Crawick Multiverse
 Jupiter Artland
 Land art

References

External links

Charles Jencks website
'Cosmic Speculation' Garden - 20 Photos
The Garden of Cosmic Speculation at Amazon Books
Scotland's Gardens Scheme

Gardens in Dumfries and Galloway
Sculpture gardens, trails and parks in the United Kingdom
Mathematical artworks
Land art